Ebrahimabad-e Jadid (also Romanized as Ebrāhīmābād-e Jadīd; also known as Ebrāhīmābād) is a village in Chahdegal Rural District, Negin Kavir District, Fahraj County, Kerman Province, Iran. At the 2006 census, its population was 458, in 125 families.

References 

Populated places in Fahraj County